Stranný is a municipality and village in Benešov District in the Central Bohemian Region of the Czech Republic. It has about 100 inhabitants.

Administrative parts
The village of Břevnice is an administrative part of Stranný.

References

Villages in Benešov District